Dhodial (also known as Dhudial) is a town and union council located near Baffa between Mansehra and Shinkiari in Mansehra District in Khyber Pakhtunkhwa province of Pakistan. Dhodial is a fertile region known for its vegetables and tobacco. Dhodial is also well known for its pheasant conservation project. The town was badly affected by the 2005 Pakistan earthquake.

Location
Dhodial is north of Mansehra in Hazara area at an altitude of 3,267 feet. The river Siren flows alongside the town.

Health care 
This area is known for the treatment of mentally ill patients. The Government of Pakistan established a National Psychiatric Health unit, called the "Government Mental & General Hospital" in Dhodial in the early 1960s. Its purpose was to treat patients with mental illness and to function as a general hospital. It had facilities for the treatment of mentally disabled patients, including physical and mental grooming. Mohammad Irfan was the initial medical superintendent and consultant psychiatrist. The government's other plans included the SOS Children's Villages and National Pheasantry. This hospital became tuberculosis sanitorium Dadar in 2002 and Hazara University was formed in it.

Education 
The University of Hazara is situated near Dhodial and provides education to students throughout Mansehra District and the Hazara Region.

Politics
The prominent political group is the Pakistan tehreek insaf which is led by Imran Khan. The Swatis,Turk, Awan, and Hashmi tribes that are in the majority coalition are also politically strong and influential. As people are getting educated, political situation is improving and parties like PTI are emerging. Other political parties are the PML N Jamiat Ullamay e Islam, Jammat Islami Pakistan. Dhodial has three village councils: Village Council Malkal, Arghoshal and Girwal. The largest is VC Malkal.

Conservation
The people of Dhodial practice conservation and captive breeding of various species of pheasants. Dhodial Pheasantry, Asia's largest pheasantry, is located near the village.

References

Union councils of Mansehra District
Populated places in Mansehra District